Assicurazioni Generali S.p.A. (meaning 'general insurances') or simply Generali Group is an Italian insurance company based in Trieste. As of 2019, it is the largest of its kind in Italy and among the top ten largest insurance companies in the world by net premiums and assets.

At the time, Trieste was the most important seaport of the Austrian Empire. The company grew in importance, becoming one of the largest insurance operators both in Italy and in Central Europe. , the company ranks 57th on the Fortune Global 500 list of companies and 43rd on MITs worldwide "Smartest Companies" ranking in 2015.

Generali's major competitors at the international level are AXA, Allianz and Zurich Insurance Group.

Operations

Generali operates primarily in Europe, the Middle East, and East Asia, with large market shares in Italy, Czech Republic, Poland, Hungary, Germany (under the name of Generali Deutschland), France, Austria, Slovenia, The Netherlands, Croatia, Serbia (as Generali Osiguranje), Spain, Switzerland, Romania, Israel, Japan, China and Bosnia and Herzegovina, with secondary operations in Latin America. Its United States operations are concentrated in financial products management, a result of the group's acquisition of Business Men's Assurance Company of America (BMA) in 1990 and travel insurance products as part of the Europ Assistance Group. 

In 2002, Generali sold BMA's life insurance arm to the Royal Bank of Canada. In 2013, Generali sold its US reinsurance arm to Scor.

On Jerusalem's Jaffa Road, the Generali Building (בניין ג'נרלי), built by the company in 1935, is still known by that name although the company operated its Jerusalem branch in the building only from 1935 to 1946. The Generali Building is still owned by the Italian insurance firm through its local representative, the Migdal Insurance Company. The building currently houses various government offices, including the Jerusalem District Administration, the Ministry of Interior, the Department of Immigration and Population Registry, and the Internal Auditing Office. It is a famous Jerusalem landmark, due to the large and well-preserved stone statue of a winged lion on its roof; this is the Lion of Saint Mark, patron saint of Venice, and the symbol of the Generali insurance company which appears on all of its branches worldwide since 1848.

In India, the company is represented by Future Generali, a joint venture of Future group and Assicurazioni Generali. It provides life, property and casualty insurance. The non-life business is known as Future Generali India Insurance Company Limited. The life business is known as Future Generali India Life Insurance Company Limited.

Subsidiaries
The main subsidiaries of the group in Italy include Alleanza Assicurazioni, Banca Generali, Cattolica Assicurazioni, Generali Italia, Genertel and Genertellife. Its subsidiaries in France include Europ Assistance.

In 2006, Generali bought the controlling stake of Delta Osiguranje, a Serbian insurer, from Delta Holding. In 2014, the group bought the remaining stake from the minority shareholders. The subsidiary was renamed to Generali Osiguranje Srbija.

Generali Group also had subsidiaries in Croatia and Montenegro, also known as Generali Osiguranje.

Banks ownership
Assicurazioni Generali was an active minority owner of Italian banks, such as Banca Intesa (7.54% direct and indirect ownership) and Banca Nazionale del Lavoro (approx 8.72%  in 2004). Both banks are no longer held by Generali Group.

Banca Generali is a subsidiary of Assicurazioni Generali.

Mediobanca
Vincenzo Maranghi and Enrico Cuccia oversaw a great deal of Generali's operations, due to Mediobanca's influence in their financial affairs.

Shareholder structure
As of June 2016, Assicurazioni Generali's largest shareholders were:
 12.79% Mediobanca S.p.A.
 9.95% Caltagirone (Francesco Gaetano Caltagirone)
 9.82% Leonardo Del Vecchio 
 4.75% Benetton family (through Edizione holding)

Based on the share capital, 65.13% of Assicurazioni Generali is owned by Italian investors.

Notable employees
Franz Kafka worked for nearly nine months (between November 1, 1907, and July 15, 1908) at the Assicurazioni Generali office in Prague.

Sponsorship
Generali is the sponsor of France National Volleyball Team, and sponsored the French Federation of Volleyball for 19 years. It launched the Responsible Sports Charter in 2010, coherently with the Group guidelines, to actively promote the culture of sustainability in sports.

They also sponsor two football stadiums: the Stadion Letná and the Franz Horr Stadium.

Controversy
A lawsuit aiming to collect claims on life insurance policies sold to victims of the Holocaust was dropped after a ten-year struggle. Sidney Zabludoff, a Holocaust insurance expert, estimates that Generali had coverage on about 110,000 Jews at the time, which he estimated to be worth $4.5 billion today. In court papers, Generali says it had paid $135 million on about 5,200 claims.

The Law & Order episode "Blood Money" is based on Generali subsidiaries selling life insurance to poor Jews in WWII Europe and then not paying out in case of death. In the episode, the motive for a retired insurance salesman's murder appears to be a series of policies he sold to Jews in Poland during the Holocaust.

See also

 Palazzo delle Assicurazioni Generali (Milan)
 Generali Building
 European Financial Services Roundtable

References

External links

1831 establishments in the Austrian Empire
Companies based in Trieste
Companies listed on the Borsa Italiana
Conglomerate companies of Italy
Financial services companies established in 1831
Generali Group
Insurance companies of Italy
Italian brands
Multinational companies headquartered in Italy